Figging is the practice of inserting a piece of skinned ginger root into the human anus in order to generate an acute burning sensation. Historically this was a method of punishment, but it has since been adopted as a practice of BDSM.  the 19th-century word "feaguing."

History

This method of physical punishment was first used as a form of discipline on female slaves in Ancient Greece.  The detainee was restrained to varying degrees in order to restrict mobility while the sensation grew from uncomfortable to extreme.

Method
The ginger, which is skinned and often carved into the shape of a butt plug, causes an intense burning sensation, and often intolerable discomfort to the subject. The effect reaches its maximum within two to five minutes after insertion, and persists for around thirty minutes before gradually easing. The ginger, after use, can be further skinned, and used to extend the experience; each fresh application of ginger root refreshes the duration of the sensations in the subject.

If the person being figged tightens the muscles of the anus, the sensation becomes more intense. For this reason it is sometimes used in caning to penalize clenching of the buttocks. The subject must choose between bracing for the strike, at the consequence of increased burning sensation, or relaxing the buttocks and taking the full force of the blow.

See also

 Gingering, in horses
 Glossary of BDSM 
 Rhaphanidosis
 Soring

Further reading
 Lady Green (1998). Kinkycrafts: 99 Do-It-Yourself S/M Toys for the Kinky Handyperson.  206 pages

References

External links
Figging: The Art Of Ginger Root Play: article on figging
Theory and Practice of Figging
Figging: Anal Discipline
Figging: The Ginger Experience

Corporal punishments
Physical torture techniques
Anal eroticism
BDSM terminology
Ginger
Spanking